Holly Elizabeth Robinson Peete (born September 18, 1964) is an American actress and singer. She is known for her roles as Judy Hoffs on the Fox police drama 21 Jump Street, Vanessa Russell on the ABC sitcom Hangin' with Mr. Cooper, and Dr. Malena Ellis on the NBC/The WB sitcom For Your Love. She also served as one of the original co-hosts of the CBS Daytime talk show, The Talk.

After graduating from high school, Peete entered Sarah Lawrence College in New York. She majored in Psychology and French. After she graduated in 1986, she considered attending graduate school and perhaps working in languages for the U.S. State Department. However, she decided to give an acting career a chance. Within a short time, Peete found roles on a television series and in two films.

Peete's children's book, My Brother Charlie, won her an NAACP Image Award for Outstanding Literary Work in March 2011. In 2012 the book was awarded the Dolly Gray Children's Literature Award.

Early life
Peete was born Holly Elizabeth Robinson in Philadelphia, Pennsylvania, the daughter of Dolores and Matt Robinson (the original Gordon on Sesame Street). Her mother was a school teacher, in public relations, and later a personal talent manager, and her father a producer/writer. She has an older brother named Matthew Thomas Robinson III. She attended Greene Street Friends School in nearby Germantown.  In 1974, her family moved to California. Peete graduated from Santa Monica High School in Santa Monica, California, where her classmates included Rob Lowe and Yvette Lee Bowser. Peete graduated from Sarah Lawrence College with a degree in psychology and French. Peete studied abroad for a year at the Sorbonne, and is fluent in French. While there she sang in Paris nightclubs, including a performance with jazz musician Lionel Hampton at the Hotel Meridian Jazz Club.

Career
She made her first television appearance on Sesame Street. She recalls that when she was six years old, she kept blowing her line, saying "Hi, Daddy", instead of "Hi, Gordon", his character's name. She ended up with just an appearance where she walked down the street with Big Bird. At the age of 11, Holly worked for the children's show Kidsworld as a celebrity correspondent; she interviewed many actors and actresses for the program. As an actress, she has appeared on the TV series 21 Jump Street (1987–1991), Hangin' with Mr. Cooper (1992–1997), For Your Love (1998–2002), and Like Family (2003–2004). She was featured in the video for the 1990 hit single "Whip Appeal" by Babyface as the sultry radio host at the beginning of the video. In 1992, she portrayed Diana Ross in The Jacksons: An American Dream. Robinson most recently starred on the UPN comedy Love, Inc.. The show lasted just one season, and was canceled after the WB/UPN merger.

Robinson has also had a limited career as a singer and recording artist, including the introductory song to 21 Jump Street. She contributed a variety of songs to the soundtrack of the film Howard the Duck. (She appeared as a musician/singer in a minor role in the film.) She recorded the theme song "We Got Our Love" for the 1987 film Three for the Road. She and Dawnn Lewis, along with R&B quartet En Vogue, performed the theme song for the first season of Hangin' with Mr. Cooper.

In 2006, she won, along with fellow writer Daniel Paisner, the Quills Award in Sports for the book Get Your Own Damn Beer, I'm Watching the Game!: A Woman's Guide to Loving Pro Football.

In 2010, she participated in The Celebrity Apprentice 3, playing for her own charity, the HollyRod Foundation, which provides support for families with Parkinson's disease or autism.

Robinson began co-hosting The Talk, a CBS daytime talk show, on October 18, 2010. In this forum, Robinson was known for expressing herself through her ethnicity and being especially vocal about African American issues and, since her son Rodney is affected by it, autism. In April 2011, Robinson hosted a weekly series on The Talk promoting autism awareness.

After serving on The Talk for its first season, Peete along with Leah Remini were released from the show. Failure to ever disclose why the two were let go brought on a great deal of audience criticism of the show, as well as protests from the stars' fans. Sharon Osbourne, Peete's former co-host on The Talk, reasoned why the two former hosts were released from the program in a guest appearance on The Howard Stern Show, criticizing both Peete and Remini. In early 2021, Osbourne was later embroiled in a scandal for her remarks made on The Talk to Sheryl Underwood, leading to Osbourne's termination from the program. During Osbourne's scandal and termination, both Peete and Remini took to social media to reproach Osbourne over her behaviors, additionally pointing out that they were on the receiving end of similar behaviors by Osbourne. Osbourne responded with threats of defamation lawsuits against both women, but ultimately did nothing.

Peete hosted the 42nd NAACP Image Awards, alongside Wayne Brady, on March 4, 2011.

The Peete family starred in a reality TV series on OWN, entitled For Peete's Sake from 2016 to 2017. The series followed the lives of Peete and her husband Rodney as they juggle career choices with their family life.This was followed by a similar Hallmark Channel reality series Meet the Peetes, which also ran for two seasons from 2018 to 2019.

Personal life

On June 10, 1995, Robinson married Rodney Peete, a National Football League quarterback. He proposed by surprising Holly during an episode of Hangin' with Mr. Cooper on October 7, 1994. They have four children: twins, daughter Ryan Elizabeth Peete and son Rodney Peete, Jr. (born October 17, 1997), and sons Robinson Peete (born August 11, 2002), and Roman Peete (born February 25, 2005).

One of their twins, Rodney Jr., was diagnosed with autism at age three. Robinson played baseball for Sierra Canyon School (2017-2019), the same school where Bronny James and Zaire Wade play basketball.

After her father was diagnosed with Parkinson's disease, Robinson and her husband co-founded the HollyRod Foundation, which is dedicated to help find a cure for the disease, as well as for autism, and assist those living with the conditions.

In September 2012, Nestle's Carnation Breakfast Essentials announced they had teamed up with Robinson, featuring her as the spokesperson for the brand. On October 4, 2012, Robinson was inducted as an honorary member of Alpha Kappa Alpha sorority.

Filmography

Film

Television

Music Video

Note: She was credited as Holly Robinson until 1997.

References

External links

Holly Robinson Peete 2006 Interview on Sidewalks Entertainment
Holly Robinson Peete Biography

20th-century American actresses
21st-century American actresses
1964 births
Living people
American child actresses
African-American actresses
African-American television talk show hosts
American television talk show hosts
American expatriates in France
American film actresses
American television actresses
Autism activists
Participants in American reality television series
Actresses from Philadelphia
Sarah Lawrence College alumni
University of Paris alumni
American health activists
The Apprentice (franchise) contestants
20th-century African-American women
20th-century African-American people
21st-century African-American women
21st-century African-American people